

Paleontologists
 Birth of George Bax Holmes, a wealthy Quaker who collaborated with Sir Richard Owen.

References

1800s in paleontology
Paleontology